Georgi Ivanovich Vyun (born 27 October 1944 in Solntsevka, Omsk Oblast died 29 November 2008 in Saint Petersburg) was a Soviet football player and a Russian coach.

International career
Vyun played his only game for USSR on 16 June 1968 in a friendly against Austria and scored a goal in that game.

References

External links
  Profile

1944 births
2008 deaths
Soviet footballers
Soviet Union international footballers
FC Chernomorets Novorossiysk players
FC Ararat Yerevan players
FC Zenit Saint Petersburg players
Russian football managers
Russian footballers
People from Omsk Oblast
Lesgaft National State University of Physical Education, Sport and Health alumni
Association football midfielders